Château de Saint-Clair was a castle in Saint-Clair-sur-Epte, Val-d'Oise, France.

History
The remains of an ancient castle dating from the 10th century exist to the west of the town.

During 1118, Henry I of England seized the castle of Saint-Clair.

References
The Penny Cyclopædia of the Society for the Diffusion of Useful Knowledge, Volume 21. Society for the Diffusion of Useful Knowledge (Great Britain). C. Knight, 1841. page 200.]

Châteaux in Val-d'Oise